Grivče is a settlement on the northern outskirts of Ajdovščina in the Littoral region of Slovenia.

References

External links 
Grivče at Geopedia

Populated places in the Municipality of Ajdovščina